Willem Brouwer (born 30 March 1963) is a retired football striker from the Netherlands. He played professional football for nine years, for Telstar, SC Heerenveen, FC Emmen and BV Veendam.

Managerial career
After his career Brouwer became a manager in Dutch amateur football, coaching teams including Harkemase Boys, Berkum and Flevo Boys.

He was named manager at former club VV Drachten in January 2017.

References

External links
  Profile

1963 births
Living people
Dutch footballers
Dutch football managers
Association football forwards
FC Emmen players
SC Veendam players
SC Heerenveen players
SC Telstar players